Dunfermline High School is one of four main high schools located in Dunfermline, Fife, Scotland. The school also caters for pupils from Kincardine, Rosyth and surrounding villages. The school was founded in 1468. Today it has over 1,550 pupils. The current Rector is Iain Yuile.

History
Education in Dunfermline can be traced back to the founding of a monastic grammar school within Dunfermline Abbey in 1120.  King David I (son of Queen Margaret and Malcolm Canmore) initially put up the money to found a school as part of the wider operations of Dunfermline Abbey in the early 1120s.

In 1468, the will of the Abbot Richard de Bothwell made provision for a house and income for a schoolmaster. Burgh records from 1525 refer to the town school. Town and Abbey schools functioned in parallel until 1560 when the Abbey and its school were destroyed during the reformation. Although the school in the town was established separate from the Abbey, it maintained a strong link.

The makar Robert Henryson was one of the first people to hold the title "Master" of the town school. The school buildings were destroyed by fire in 1624. The school was reconstituted by Queen Anne of Denmark in the 16th century.  It is from these people, who shaped the school in the first 800 years of its life, that the house names come from: Canmore, Queen Margaret, Bothwell, and Henryson. Denmark house ceased to exist after restructuring of the school. The school went on to be known as the High School.

In June 1939, a new building opened. When a new building was constructed in 2012, this was demolished to become playing fields.

The school celebrated 500 years since its official foundation in 1968.

In August 2012, the brand new £40million Dunfermline High School was opened to pupils after many years of planning and construction.

In June 2016 Iain Yuile was announced as Rector of the school.

Feeder areas

The school's feeder primary schools are:
Within Dunfermline
 Canmore Primary School
 Commercial Primary School
 Pitreavie Primary School
 Masterton Primary School
 St Leonard's Primary School
Outwith Dunfermline
 Limekilns Primary School, Limekilns
 Camdean Primary School, Rosyth
 Kings Road Primary School, Rosyth
 Tulliallan Primary School, Kincardine

Facilities

Facilities include a five-a-side football pitch; a main football pitch; meeting room; free parking spaces on site; sports hall, fitness room and an assembly hall with a stage.

Uniform

The school badge is made up from the crest of Malcolm Canmore, the Queen Margaret Cross and the symbol of Abbot Bothwell. The two typical colours featured as part of the school blazer and ties are black and "gold" which is more or less yellow. In 2008, a second 'senior tie' was introduced which features the school's crest.

School motto

The school has two Latin mottos:
Quid agis age pro viribus, meaning "Everything you do, do it with vigour".
Labor Omnia Vincit, meaning "Work conquers everything".

Notable alumni

 Denise Coffey, English actress
 Barbara Dickson (born 1947) Singer and actress
 Greg Fleming (born 1986), football goalkeeper (notably Gretna, Ayr Utd)
 Phil Gallie (1939–2011), Conservative Member of Parliament (MP) for Ayr 1992–97 and Member of the Scottish Parliament for the South Scotland region 1999–2007
 Ncuti Gatwa (born 1992), actor
 Malcolm Grant (born 1944), Anglican priest
 Shirley Henderson (born 1965), Scottish actress
 Ian Jack (1945–2022), journalist and writer who edited the Independent on Sunday 1991–95 and Granta 1995–2007
 Sir William Kininmonth (1904–1988), architect who mixed a modern style with Scottish vernacular
 Billy Liddell (1922–2001), Scottish footballer who played his entire professional career with Liverpool F.C.
 Tom Nairn (1932–2023), Scottish political theorist of nationalism
 Thomas Shaw, 1st Baron Craigmyle (1850–1937), radical Liberal Party politician, MP for Hawick Burghs 1892–1909, and Law Lord 1909–29
Moira Shearer, Lady Kennedy (1926–2006), ballet dancer and actress.
 Alexander Simpson (1905–1975), first-class cricketer
 Thomas Spowart (1903–1971), first-class cricketer
 Ettie Stewart Steele (1890–1983), chemist, the first student to submit a PhD thesis at the University of St Andrews
 Alan Turnbull, Lord Turnbull,  lawyer, and Senator of the College of Justice, a judge of Scotland's Supreme Courts
 Michael Scott Weir (1925–2006), United Kingdom's ambassador to Egypt 1979–1985
 Craig Wilson (born 1986), footballer (notably Dunfermline, Raith)
 Andrew Wyllie CBE (born 1962), civil engineer, CEO of the Costain Group and 154th president of the Institution of Civil Engineers.

See also
 List of the oldest schools in the United Kingdom
 List of the oldest schools in the world

References

External links
school website
profile at ParentZone on Education Scotland website
reports on Education Scotland website

Secondary schools in Fife
Buildings and structures in Dunfermline
1460s establishments in Scotland